
Year 818 (DCCCXVIII) was a common year starting on Friday (link will display the full calendar) of the Julian calendar.

Events 
 By place 
 Byzantine Empire 
 Vikings known as Rus' (Norsemen) plunder the north coast of Anatolia (modern Turkey), marking the first recorded raid of Rus' people on territory in the Byzantine Empire.

 Europe 
 April 17 – King Bernard of Italy, illegitimate son of Pepin of Italy, is tried and condemned to death by Emperor Louis I. The Kingdom of Italy is reabsorbed into the Frankish Empire. 
 The Slavs known as Timočani on the Timok River break their alliance with the Bulgars. Duke Ljudevit of the Slavs in Lower Pannonia sends emissaries to Louis I, to assert his independence from the Franks.
 Al-Andalus: A grave rebellion breaks out in the suburbs of Cordoba, against the Emirate of Córdoba. Andalucian Arab refugees arrive in Fez (modern Morocco).

 Britain 
 The Anglo-Saxons, led by King Coenwulf of Mercia, raid Dyfed in Wales (approximate date).

 Asia 
 Beginning of the Lemro period: The Sambawa and Pyinsa Kingdoms are founded in present-day Myanmar.

 By topic 
 Religion 
 Theodulf, bishop of Orléans, is deposed and imprisoned, after becoming involved in a conspiracy with Bernard of Italy.

Births 
 Abu Dawud, Muslim hadith compiler (or 817)
 Al-Fath ibn Khaqan, Muslim governor (or 817)
 Ariwara no Yukihira, Japanese governor (d. 893)
 Pepin, count of Vermandois (approximate date)
 Sahl al-Tustari, Persian scholar (approximate date)

Deaths 
 April 17 – Bernard of Italy, king of the Lombards (b. 797)
 October 3 – Ermengarde, queen of the Franks
 Al-Fadl ibn Sahl, Persian vizier
 Ali al-Ridha, 8th Shia Imam (b. 766)
 Cernach mac Congalaig, king of Brega (Ireland)
 Clement, Irish scholar and saint
 Felix, bishop of Urgell (Spain)
 García I Jiménez, duke of Gascony
 Hildebold, archbishop of Cologne
 Michael the Confessor, bishop of Synnada
 Morman, chieftain and king of Brittany 
 Muiredach mac Brain, king of Leinster (Ireland) 
 Theophanes the Confessor, Byzantine monk (or 817)
 Quan Deyu, chancellor of the Tang Dynasty (b. 759)
 Yuan Zi, general of the Tang Dynasty (b. 739)

References